Emiliani is a surname. Notable people with the surname include:

Gerolamo Emiliani (1481–1537), Italian humanitarian
Cesare Emiliani (1922–1995), Italian-American scientist, micropaleontologist, and geologist

Italian-language surnames